Ty Ty Creek may refer to:

Ty Ty Creek (Warrior Creek tributary)
Ty Ty Creek (Kinchafoonee Creek tributary)